Fox Oring is a variation of the sport of Amateur Radio Direction Finding.  Fox Oring is a timed race in which individual competitors use a topographic map and a magnetic compass to navigate through diverse, wooded terrain while searching for radio transmitters.  The term is derived from the use of the term fox hunting to describe recreational radio direction finding activity and an abbreviation of the word orienteering.

Description
Like Amateur Radio Direction Finding, Fox Oring is a sport that combines the skills of orienteering and radio direction finding.  Fox Oring requires more orienteering skills than ARDF.  In a Fox Oring course, the radio transmitters put out very little power, and can be received over only very short distances, often no more than 100 meters.  The location of each transmitter will be indicated on the map with a circle.  The transmitter does not need to be exactly at the circle's center or even located inside the circle, but one should be able to receive its transmissions everywhere within the area indicated by the circle.  A competitor must use orienteering skills to navigate to the area of the circle on the map and then use radio direction finding skills to locate the very low power transmitter.

Fox Oring has increased popularity and it's now an official part of the International Amateur Radio Union Region 1 championship.

See also
Radiosport
Orienteering
Amateur radio

References
ARDF Reg-1 Working group web page with championship rules 
20th IARU Region 1 ARDF Championships 2015 
VERON Dutch Radio Amateur Club (2011). "International FoxOring Championship Maasmechelen (Belgium) 23.07.11". Retrieved Nov. 9, 2011.
VERON Dutch Radio Amateur Club (2010). "International FoxOring Championship Maasmechelen (Belgium) 11.07.10". Retrieved Nov. 9, 2011.
Deutscher Amateur-Radio Club (2010). "Deutsche Meisterschaft Foxoring Bastheim 9.-10.10.10". Retrieved Mar. 27, 2011.
Deutscher Amateur-Radio Club (2009). "Deutsche Meisterschaft Foxoring Landshut 10.-11.10.09". Retrieved Mar. 27, 2011.
Deutscher Amateur-Radio Club (2008). "Deutsche Meisterschaft Foxoring,   Haltern & Bottrop 11.-12.10.08". Retrieved Nov. 5, 2008.
Deutscher Amateur-Radio Club (2007). "Deutsche Meisterschaft Foxoring,   Erfurt 13.-14.10.07". Retrieved Oct. 28, 2007.

Radiosport
Radio navigation
Orienteering